Li Mou (Chinese: 李谋; (former name: 李眸); born 8 March 1989 in Tieling) is a Chinese football player who currently plays for China League Two side Qingdao Jonoon.

Club career
In 2009, Li Mou started his professional footballer career with Liaoning Whowin in the China League One. 
In March 2011, Li transferred to Chinese Super League side Changchun Yatai. He would eventually make his league debut for Changchun on 2 April 2011 in a game against Henan Jianye.
In July 2013, Li transferred to China League One side Chengdu Tiancheng.

On 14 February 2015, Li transferred to fellow China League One side Qingdao Jonoon.

Career statistics 
Statistics accurate as of match played 31 December 2020.

Honours

Club
Liaoning Whowin
China League One: 2009

References

External links
LI MOU at Soccerway.com

1989 births
Living people
Chinese footballers
People from Tieling
Footballers from Liaoning
Changchun Yatai F.C. players
Liaoning F.C. players
Chengdu Tiancheng F.C. players
Qingdao Hainiu F.C. (1990) players
Chinese Super League players
China League One players
China League Two players
Association football defenders